Seven Deadly is the twentieth studio album by British hard rock band UFO, released on 27 February 2012.

Reception
Since its release, this album has been met with mostly positive reviews. Geoff Barton of Classic Rock found the album "bursting with creativity and athleticism" and praised Phil Mogg for the "vim and vigour" of his singing and for his "evocative and erudite" lyrics. He adds that the album has a "darker edge this time around" and may be the best possible swansong for UFO. Rebecca Miller of Metal Temple wrote, "Not contented to sit back on their laurels, the band continues to produce high quality rock albums and Seven Deadly is certainly no exception".

Track listing

Personnel
Band members
 Phil Mogg – vocals
 Vinnie Moore – lead guitar
 Paul Raymond – keyboards, rhythm guitar
 Andy Parker – drums

Additional musicians

 Lars Lehmann - bass
 Alexa Wild, Marino Carlini – backing vocals
 Marc Hothan – harp on "The Fear"

Charts

Credits
 Tommy Newton – recorded and mixed
 Andy Le Vien – additional recordings at RMS Studio
 Steve Ward – additional recordings at SW Sounds
 Tristan Greatrex – album artwork
 Pat Johnson – band photo
 Peter Knorn – management

References

2012 albums
UFO (band) albums
SPV/Steamhammer albums